Sir Joshua Milne Crompton Cheetham  (9 July 1869 – 6 January 1938) was a British diplomat.

Born in Preston, the son of Joshua Milne Cheetham, MP, he was educated at Rossall School, from which he won a scholarship to Christ Church, Oxford. He studied classics at Oxford, after which he entered the diplomatic service. He served in Madrid, Paris, Tokyo, Berlin, Rome and Rio de Janeiro before being sent to Cairo in January 1910. When the United Kingdom declared its protectorate over Egypt in December 1914, he became acting High Commissioner, pending the arrival of Sir Henry McMahon. He took charge of the British Residency during the spring and fall of 1919, and thus had to confront the 1919 Revolution.

He later served in the British embassy in Paris, and was appointed minister to Switzerland in 1922. In 1924, he was appointed minister to Greece, after a two-year break in diplomatic relations. He was sent to Denmark in 1926, and retired in 1928.

Family
Sir Milne Cheetham married twice. His first wife was Anastasia Muravieva (aka Mouravieff) CBE (died 1976), stepdaughter of Nikolay Muraviev, the Russian Empire's Minister of Justice and later ambassador to Italy. They married in 1907 and divorced in 1923.

They had one son, Nicolas (1910–2002), who followed in his father's footsteps and went on to have a successful career in the diplomatic service.

Cheetham's second wife was Cynthia Charlette Seymour (d. 1968), whom he married on 11 July 1923. She was the daughter of Sir Horace Alfred Damer Seymour and Elizabeth Mary Romilly.

Decorations
Sir Milne Cheetham received the King George V Coronation Medal in 1911 and was made a Knight Commander of the Order of St Michael and St George in 1915.

References

1869 births
1938 deaths
Alumni of Christ Church, Oxford
Ambassadors of the United Kingdom to Switzerland
Ambassadors of the United Kingdom to Denmark
High Commissioners of the United Kingdom to Egypt
Knights Commander of the Order of St Michael and St George
People educated at Rossall School
People from Preston, Lancashire
Ambassadors of the United Kingdom to Greece